Martín Jaite was the defending champion, but lost in the second round to Karel Nováček.

Goran Ivanišević won the title by defeating Guillermo Pérez Roldán 6–7(2–7), 6–1, 6–4, 7–6(7–5) in the final.

Seeds
All seeds received a bye into the second round.

Draw

Finals

Top half

Section 1

Section 2

Bottom half

Section 3

Section 4

References

External links
 Official results archive (ATP)
 Official results archive (ITF)

Stuttgart Singles
Singles 1990